La Sauvetat may refer to the following places in France:

 La Sauvetat, Gers, a commune in the Gers department
 La Sauvetat, Puy-de-Dôme, a commune in the Puy-de-Dôme department
 La Sauvetat-du-Dropt, a commune in the Lot-et-Garonne department